The Concerto for Piano is a composition for solo piano and orchestra by the American composer Elliott Carter.  The work was commissioned by the pianist Jacob Lateiner with support from the Ford Foundation.  It was composed between 1964 and 1965 and was first performed at Symphony Hall, Boston on January 6, 1967, by Lateiner and the Boston Symphony Orchestra under the conductor Erich Leinsdorf.  The piece was dedicated to the composer Igor Stravinsky for his 85th birthday.

Composition
The concerto has a duration of roughly 25 minutes and is composed in two numbered movements.  The work is built upon techniques from two previous Carter's pieces: his String Quartet No. 2 (1959) and the Double Concerto for Harpsichord and Piano with Two Chamber Orchestras (1961).  Carter elaborated on this in the score program notes, writing:

Instrumentation
The work is scored for a solo piano and an orchestra comprising three flutes (two doubling piccolo), two oboes, cor anglais, two clarinets, bass clarinet, two bassoons, contrabassoon, four horns, three trumpets, three trombones, tuba, two percussionists, and strings.

Reception
The concerto has been highly praised by music critics and is regarded as one of the composer's best works.  Reviewing a 2013 performance of the piece, Andrew Clark of the Financial Times called it "a classic of his high modernist phase" and remarked, "The piece hasn't become any 'lighter' with the years, but the inexorable sweep of this reading helps to mitigate the dense thickets of such complex music."  In a guide to Carter's music, Tom Service of The Guardian similarly lauded:
In a thank you letter to Carter, the composer Igor Stravinsky described the composition as "a masterpiece," despite admitting that he at one point had trouble hearing everything that was happening in the score.  The music critic Alex Ross commented on Stravinsky's remark, adding:

References

Concertos by Elliott Carter
1965 compositions
Carter
Process music pieces